Carlene Thompson is an American author of suspense thriller novels.

Her first book, Black for Remembrance, was published in 1990 by Little, Brown and was well received. Her books are suspense novels, often with romantic elements and many take place in Thompson's home state of West Virginia. Her books often feature animals, which she bases on animals she knows in real life.

Books
Black for Remembrance, Little, Brown, 1990
All Fall Down, Avon Books, 1993 
The Way You Look Tonight, St. Martin's Press, 1997 
Tonight You're Mine, St. Martin's Press, 1998 
In the Event of My Death, St. Martin's Press, 1999 
Don't Close Your Eyes, St. Martin's Press, 2000 
Since You've Been Gone, St. Martin's Press, 2001
If She Should Die, St. Martin's Press, 2004 
Share No Secrets, St. Martin's Press, 2005
Last Whisper, St. Martin's Press, 2006 
Last Seen Alive, St. Martin's Press, 2007 
If You Ever Tell, St. Martin's Press, 2008 
You Can Run..., St. Martin's Press, 2009 
Nowhere to Hide, St. Martin's Press, 2010 
To the Grave, St. Martin's Press, 2012
Can't Find My Way Home, Severn House, 2014
Just A Breath Away Severn House, 2018
Praying For Time 2020

References

20th-century American novelists
21st-century American novelists
American thriller writers
Living people
Novelists from West Virginia
American women novelists
Women thriller writers
Year of birth missing (living people)
20th-century American women writers
21st-century American women writers